Cyclophorus elegans is a species of small, air-breathing, land snails with an operculum, terrestrial pulmonate gastropod molluscs in the family Cyclophoridae. It is found in China.

References 

 Die chinesischen Land-und Subwasser-Gastropoden des Natur-Museums Senckenberg. T.Yen, 1939

External links 
 

Gastropods described in 1881
elegans
Fauna of China